Portland architecture includes a number of notable buildings, a wide range of styles, and a few notable pioneering architects.

The scale of many projects is relatively small, as a result of the relatively small size of downtown-Portland blocks (200 feet by 200 feet) and strict height restrictions enacted to protect views of nearby Mount Hood from Portland's West Hills. Although these restrictions limit project size, they contribute to Portland's reputation for thoughtful urban planning and livability.

Many older buildings have been preserved and re-used, including many glazed terra-cotta buildings.

Portland is a leader in sustainable architecture and is known for its focus on urban planning. As of 2009, Portland has the second highest number of LEED-accredited "green" buildings of any city in the U.S., second only to Chicago.

Architects
Well-known architect Pietro Belluschi began his career in Portland with the prolific firm of A.E. Doyle, leaving his imprint upon the city until the 1980s. Other notable architects and firms who have worked in Portland are Skidmore, Owings and Merrill (SOM), Michael Graves, Cass Gilbert, Rapp and Rapp, Daniel Burnham & Co., Kohn Pedersen Fox (KPF), Frank Lloyd Wright, Richard Neutra, Zimmer Gunsul Frasca Architects (ZGF) and Brad Cloepfil of Allied Works. Local architects that have had a large influence on Portland's architecture include Francis Marion Stokes and his father William R. Stokes (combined works include over 270 buildings from 1882 to the 1960s), the Victorian-era architect Warren H. Williams (architect of several surviving cast-iron buildings including the Blagen Block as well as the stick-gothic Old Church) and Whidden & Lewis (architects of Portland City Hall, the long demolished Portland Hotel, the Weinhard Brewery Complex, the Failing Office Building, several office buildings on SW 3rd Ave. and numerous residences).

Tallest buildings 

The tallest high-rises and skyscrapers in Portland (as of April 2016) are:

Wells Fargo Center (546 ft./166 m., completed 1972)
U.S. Bancorp Tower (536 ft./163 m., completed 1983)
KOIN Center (509 ft./155 m., completed 1984)
Park Avenue West Tower (501 ft./153 m., completed 2016)
PacWest Center (418 ft./127 m., completed 1984)
Fox Tower (376 ft./113 m., completed 2000)
Standard Insurance Center (367 ft./112 m., completed 1968)
Cosmopolitan (338 ft./104 m., U/C, began construction July 2014)
John Ross Tower (325 ft./99 m., completed 2007)
The Ardea (325 ft./99 m., completed 2008)
Mirabella Portland (325 ft./99 m., completed 2010)
Congress Center (325 ft./98 m., completed 1980)
Mark O. Hatfield United States Courthouse (318 ft/97 m., completed 1997)
Moda Tower (formerly ODS Tower) (308 ft/94 m., completed 1999)
The Meriwether, West Building (303 ft/92 m., completed 2006)
Lloyd Center Tower (290 ft/88 m., completed 1981)
1000 Broadway (288 ft./88 m., completed 1991)

Other notable buildings
Other notable buildings in Portland include:

The Arlene Schnitzer Concert Hall, a restored historic theater (formerly The Paramount) and accompanying Heathman Hotel.
The Benson Hotel, an elegant, restored historic hotel.
Pietro Belluschi's Equitable Building was the first aluminum-clad building and the first to be completely sealed with an air-conditioned environment.
Lloyd Center mall, Oregon's largest mall, opened in the summer of 1960.
The Meier & Frank Building – Meier & Frank's full-block, glazed terra-cotta flagship department store.
The Moda Center, home of the Portland Trail Blazers.
The Oregon Convention Center's twin spires are a prominent feature on the eastside skyline.
The Pioneer Courthouse, the oldest federal building in the Pacific Northwest and the second-oldest west of the Mississippi River.
The Pittock Mansion is a popular tourist attraction.
The Portland Building, by Michael Graves, the major post-modern building constructed in the U.S.
The Seward Hotel, better known as the Governor Hotel (east wing), now part of the Sentinel Hotel.
Union Station, an active Florentine-style train station with a 150 ft. clock tower.
The United States National Bank Building, a large classical-style bank building built in 1917 that remains in near-original condition
One of the largest collections of cast iron architecture in the United States, primarily in Old Town.  A classic example of such construction is the Grand Stable and Carriage Building, built by Oregon business pioneer Simeon Gannett Reed.

Bridges

Portland has many bridges:

Bridges on the Willamette River
St. Johns Bridge (1931; suspension)
Burlington Northern Railroad Bridge 5.1 (1908 swing span converted in 1989 to vertical-lift)
Fremont Bridge (1973; tied-arch)
Broadway Bridge (1913; bascule truss)
Steel Bridge (1912; steel through-truss, double-deck vertical lift)
Burnside Bridge (1926; bascule draw)
Morrison Bridge (1958; bascule draw)
Hawthorne Bridge (1910; through truss, vertical lift)
Marquam Bridge (1966; through truss)
Tilikum Crossing (2015; cable-stayed)
Ross Island Bridge (1926; cantilever truss)
Sellwood Bridge (2016; deck arch)

Bridges on the Columbia River
Glenn L. Jackson Memorial Bridge (1982; segregated concrete box girder)
Interstate Bridge (1917/1958; through truss, vertical lift)
Burlington Northern Railroad Bridge 9.6 (1908; with a 450-foot swing section)

Other bridges
Vista Bridge

See also
 List of sports venues in Portland, Oregon
 National Register of Historic Places listings in Portland

References

External links
Skyscraperpage.com diagram of Portland's buildings by height
PCC.edu: Guide to Portland's Bridges
City of Portland's List of Historic Landmarks (Excel spreadsheet)
Architecture Foundation of Oregon - Look Around Guide to Portland Architecture
Bibliography of Portland Architecture and Architectural History
Portland Oregon Architecture: An Architectural Map

Portland